Avua-Siav Leo Tomovich Nelson (born 8 August 1980), or simply Leo Nelson, is a Russian retired professional footballer.

Club career
He played in the Russian Football National League for FC Metallurg Lipetsk in 2000.

International career
He was the first player of African descent to represent Russia internationally on any level (he played for the Under-19 national team).

Personal life
His father is from Ghana and his mother is Russian.

References

1980 births
Russian people of Ghanaian descent
Living people
Russian footballers
Association football defenders
FC Torpedo Moscow players
FC Torpedo-2 players
FC Spartak Tambov players
FC Metallurg Lipetsk players
FC Zhenis Astana players
FC Gomel players
FC Orenburg players
Kazakhstan Premier League players
Belarusian Premier League players
Russian expatriate footballers
Expatriate footballers in Kazakhstan
Expatriate footballers in Belarus
Russian expatriate sportspeople in Kazakhstan